The 2019 Zhuhai Championships was a men's tennis tournament played on outdoor hard courts. It was the 1st edition of the Zhuhai Championships (replacing the Shenzhen Open), and part of the ATP Tour 250 series of the 2019 ATP Tour. It took place at the Hengqin International Tennis Center in Zhuhai, China, from September 23–29.

Singles main-draw entrants

Seeds

1 Rankings are as of September 16, 2019

Other entrants
The following players received wildcards into the singles main draw:
  Wu Di
  Zhang Ze
  Zhang Zhizhen

The following player received entry using a protected ranking into the singles main draw:
  Andy Murray

The following players received entry from the qualifying draw:
  Damir Džumhur 
  Tatsuma Ito 
  Dominik Koepfer 
  Kwon Soon-woo

Withdrawals
  Tomáš Berdych → replaced by  Tennys Sandgren
  Pierre-Hugues Herbert → replaced by  Steve Johnson
  Andrey Rublev → replaced by  Peter Gojowczyk

Retirements
  Casper Ruud (illness)
  Stefanos Tsitsipas (breathing problem)

Doubles main-draw entrants

Seeds

1 Rankings are as of September 16, 2019

Other entrants
The following pairs received wildcards into the doubles main draw:
  Gong Maoxin /  Zhang Ze
  Wu Di /  Zhang Zhizhen

Champions

Singles 

  Alex de Minaur def.  Adrian Mannarino, 7–6(7–4), 6–4

Doubles 

  Sander Gillé /  Joran Vliegen def.  Marcelo Demoliner /  Matwé Middelkoop,  7–6(7–2), 7–6(7–4)

References

External links 
Official website

2019
2019 ATP Tour
2019 in Chinese tennis
September 2019 sports events in China